The 2003–04 season was the 93rd season in Hajduk Split’s history and their 13th in the Prva HNL. Their second place finish in the 2002–03 season meant it was their 13th successive season playing in the Prva HNL.

First-team squad 
Squad at end of season

Left club during season

Competitions

Overall record

Prva HNL

First stage

Second stage (championship play-off)

Results summary

Results by round

Results by opponent

Source: 2003–04 Croatian First Football League article

Matches

Croatian Football Super Cup

Source: HRnogomet.com

Prva HNL

First stage

Source: HRnogomet.com

Championship play-off

Source: HRnogomet.com

Croatian Football Cup

Source: HRnogomet.com

UEFA Cup

Qualifying round

First round

Second round 

Source: uefa.com

Player seasonal records

Top scorers

Source: Competitive matches

See also
2003–04 Croatian First Football League
2003–04 Croatian Football Cup

References

External sources
 2003–04 Prva HNL at HRnogomet.com
 2003–04 Croatian Cup at HRnogomet.com
 2003–04 UEFA Cup at rsssf.com

HNK Hajduk Split seasons
Hajduk Split
Croatian football championship-winning seasons